Louis Henri Gérard Antoine Pierre Marie de Cardevac d'Havrincourt (29 June 1863 – 19 July 1928) was a French equestrian. He competed in the driving and jumping events at the 1900 Summer Olympics.

References

External links
 

1863 births
1928 deaths
French male equestrians
Olympic equestrians of France
Equestrians at the 1900 Summer Olympics
Sportspeople from Allier